A cartographer is a person who deals with the art, science and technology of making and using maps.

Cartographer may also refer to:
 Cartographer (album), album by E.S. Posthumus
 The Cartographer, extended play by The Republic of Wolves
 Cartographers (board game), a board game designed by Jordy Adan

See also
 Cartography (album),  by Arve Henriksen
 
 Mapmaker (disambiguation)